Charlie Chapman (born 1 December 1998) is an English scrum-half currently playing for Gloucester Rugby in Premiership Rugby. He has represented Scotland under 20s and was dual-registered with Hartpury for the 2018-19 season.
 
Chapman represented Scotland in the U20s Six Nations and earned selection for the Junior World Championship in France.

References

Gloucester Rugby players
Rugby union scrum-halves
1998 births
Living people